Christopher Andrew Sabo (born January 19, 1962) is a former third baseman in Major League Baseball who played for the Cincinnati Reds, Baltimore Orioles, Chicago White Sox, and St. Louis Cardinals between 1988 and 1996. He was the head baseball coach of the Akron Zips (2020–2022).

Early life
Sabo was born in Detroit, Michigan, the son of a plumber and a waitress. The Sabos lived in Rosedale Park, three blocks from the 1968 Championship Detroit Tiger Willie Horton.

Sabo attended Detroit Catholic Central High School. In high school, he excelled as both a hockey goalie and a golfer in addition to being one of the area's best baseball players, twice earning all-state honors. Sabo played hockey on two national championship 17-and-under teams and, before enrolling at Michigan, also played hockey as a goaltender in one game in the Ontario Junior Hockey League for the Niagara Falls Flyers in the 1979–80 season. As a senior, he was torn between pursuing a hockey career or a baseball career but ultimately chose baseball and a scholarship to the University of Michigan despite being drafted in the 1980 Major League Baseball Draft by the Montreal Expos.

In 1982, he played collegiate summer baseball with the Orleans Cardinals of the Cape Cod Baseball League. A third baseman, Sabo was a key component on a strong Michigan team that finished third in the College World Series in 1983, a season in which Sabo was joined as a starting infielder by future Reds teammate and Baseball Hall of Famer Barry Larkin. That season, Sabo earned first-team All-American honors from The Sporting News and Baseball America.

Professional career

Sabo was selected by the Cincinnati Reds in the second round of the 1983 Major League Baseball Draft.

Sabo spent five seasons in the Reds' minor league system, during which he never put up impressive numbers, although in two of those seasons he was named the Most Valuable Player of his team. By , he was given little chance of making the big-league team out of spring training, but his ability combined with his grit and hustle was reminiscent of, and endeared him to, Reds manager Pete Rose.  With Buddy Bell starting the season on the disabled list and the Reds needing a third baseman, Sabo stepped in and was the opening day starter. Batting eighth, Sabo collected his first hit, stolen base and run scored in the seventh inning and made a run-saving play on defense in the Reds' 5–4, 12-inning win over the St. Louis Cardinals.

Sabo continued to make the most of the opportunity throughout the season. On April 18, he hit his first career home run, a solo shot off San Francisco Giants pitcher Mike Krukow. For the season, he posted a .271 average with 11 home runs and 44 RBI, pounded out 40 doubles and also stole 46 bases. He won the National League Rookie of the Year Award and quickly became a fan favorite with his hustle and determination punctuated by his flat-top haircut and ever-present wraparound protective eyeglasses commonly known as Rec Specs. That season, Sabo was featured on the cover of Baseball America and The Sporting News and was the subject of a feature article in Sports Illustrated.

After a forgettable  campaign in which he was limited to 82 games, Sabo returned to help lead the Reds to a World Series Championship as he batted .270 with 25 home runs and 71 RBI. Sabo also had an outstanding World Series, batting an astounding .583 with nine hits in 16 at bats, including two home runs and five RBI plus two walks. At the Reds' Fountain Square victory celebration, he famously grabbed the microphone and bellowed to the cheering crowd, "We've got the rings, we've got the money, we've got everything!"

Sabo never again hit above .260 nor would have more than 10 steals in a season. Baltimore signed him in  where he endured another injury-plagued season and then split 1995 between Chicago and St. Louis.

His homecoming did not go as well as he had hoped. In July, Sabo shattered his bat, which was filled with cork. As a result of the incident, Sabo received a seven-game suspension. Sabo maintains that he never corked a bat in his life, (even saying to the press afterward, "I can't even change a lightbulb!") claiming that the bat in question (which he was given in the middle of the plate appearance after breaking his original bat) belonged to another player (whom he would not name). Sabo also pointed out his minimal offensive numbers that year (.256 batting average with 3 home runs), saying "That's hardly a good endorsement for the cork industry." Moreover, even the live television announcers believed the illegal bat had already cracked on a foul ball prior to breaking it on the following pitch, leading them to speculate (after the cork was discovered) that it would have been highly unlikely for Sabo to knowingly risk using an apparently damaged bat if he had known it was also corked.

In a nine-season career, Sabo hit .268 with 116 home runs and 426 RBI in 911 games. Also an excellent fielder, Sabo led National League third basemen in fielding percentage in 1988 and 1990 and was second in 1991.

Reds manager Pete Rose gave Sabo the nickname "Spuds" during his rookie season in 1988, citing a resemblance to a bull terrier character in Bud Light commercials named Spuds MacKenzie.

On October 23, 2018 Sabo was named head baseball coach at the University of Akron. Akron had a losing record of 1-12 in their 2020 season.

Head coaching record

Personal life
Sabo lives in Sarasota, Florida with his wife, Susan, whom he married in 1989, and their three daughters Annie, Brooke, and Olivia. Annie is currently a sports reporter on Bally Sports Ohio covering the Reds. 

He has served as a coach in the Reds' minor league system for the Advanced Rookie Billings Mustangs and Class A Dayton Dragons. He has also served as an assistant coach for the University of Cincinnati. In 2009, he began attending the Northern Kentucky University law school.

Sabo was inducted in the Cincinnati Reds Hall Of Fame, along with Big Red Machine reliever Pedro Borbón and 19th-century pitcher Tony Mullane, on July 17, 2010. The Reds gave away Chris Sabo bobblehead dolls to fans in attendance that evening.

On January 29, 2017, Sabo was named Field Manager of the Green Bay Bullfrogs of the Northwoods League, a college summer league.

On October 23, 2018 Sabo was introduced as the new head coach of the baseball team at the University of Akron. The program practiced with redshirted walk-ons (as is the practice for a new program) with the first class of recruits for the 2019–20 academic year. Sabo parted ways with Akron in 2022.

He is an avid golfer, plays in celebrity golf tournaments and is a member of Kenwood Country Club in Cincinnati. He is good enough to have qualified for several major United States Golf Association tournaments. He is also a popular figure at Reds reunion events.

References

External links

1962 births
Living people
Major League Baseball Rookie of the Year Award winners
National League All-Stars
Baltimore Orioles players
Chicago White Sox players
Cincinnati Reds players
St. Louis Cardinals players
Major League Baseball third basemen
Michigan Wolverines baseball players
Orleans Firebirds players
Detroit Catholic Central High School alumni
Baseball players from Detroit
Nashville Sounds players
Vermont Reds players
American people of Hungarian descent
All-American college baseball players
Akron Zips baseball coaches